Šljivovica is a village in the municipality of Vushtrri, Kosovo. According to the 2011 census, the village has a population of 14 inhabitants. In the village there are the ruins of an old church and an old cemetery.

Population

References

Villages in Vushtrri